The 2012–13 Guadalajara season was the 66th professional season of Mexico's top-flight football league. The season is split into two tournaments—the Torneo Apertura and the Torneo Clausura—each with identical formats and each contested by the same eighteen teams. Guadalajara began their season on July 22, 2012 against Toluca. Guadalajara played their homes games on Sundays at 5:00pm local time. Guadalajara reached the final phase in the Apertura tournament but were eliminated by Toluca in the quarter-finals, Guadalajara did not reach the final phase in the Clausura tournament.

Torneo Apertura

Squad

Regular season

Apertura 2012 results

Final phase

Toluca advanced 5–2 on aggregate

Goalscorers

Regular season

Source:

Final phase

Results

Results summary

Results by round

Torneo Clausura

Squad

Regular season

Clausura 2013 results

Guadalajara did not qualify to the Final Phase

Goalscorers

Results

Results summary

Results by round

References

Mexican football clubs 2012–13 season